Choi Wonshik is an optical physicist researching deep-tissue imaging and imaging through scattering media. He is a full professor in the Department of Physics of Korea University where he serves as the associate director at the IBS Center for Molecular Spectroscopy and Dynamics. Inside the Center, he leads the Super-depth Imaging Lab. He has been cited more than 4,000 times and has an h-index of 32. He is a fellow of The Optical Society.

Education 
Choi majored in physics and received his B.S., M.S., and Ph.D. from the Department of Physics of Seoul National University in 1997, 1999, and 2004, respectively. His M.S. adviser was Professor Lee Jai-Hyung and doctoral adviser was Professor An Kyungwon. His field of study for his doctorate was atomic and laser physics.

Career 
He held two postdoc research positions with the first taking place in the Department of Physics at Seoul National University. During his doctorate program and first postdoc position, Choi observed that the cavity-QED microlaser system at MIT exhibits sub-Poisson photon statistics by measuring the second-order correlation which experimentally proved that the microlaser is a nonclassical source; a long-standing theoretical prediction. The second position was in the Michael S. Feld Group in the George R. Harrison Spectroscopy Laboratory of MIT for a period of three and a half years in which he focused on biomedical optics. During this time, he invented tomographic phase microscopy which enables quantitative 3-D imaging of the refractive index of living cells and tissues of which a patent was later filed. He then implemented the first optical diffraction tomography of living cells which led to collaborative studies in biology and soft matter. These studies led to a new application area for digital holographic and interferometric microscopy.

In September 2009, Choi returned to South Korea to work in the Department of Physics of Korea University as an assistant professor. He became an associate professor in 2012 and a full professor in 2017. He is the principal investigator of the Super-depth Imaging Lab created in July 2016. The lab is within the IBS Center for Molecular Spectroscopy and Dynamics which falls under both the Institute for Basic Science and the Department of Physics in Korea University.

Choi's research interests include ultrahigh-resolution deep-tissue imaging, control of wave propagation within scattering media, ultra-thin endoscopic microscope, and far-field control of near-field waves. The research direction of his laboratory is to resolve tissue turbidity for super-depth optical imaging, light manipulation and phototherapy.

Journal editing
 2010 - 2016: Associate editor, Biomedical Optics Express
 2013 - 2015: Executive editor, Journal of Optical Society of Korea
 2017–present: Editorial board member, Scientific Reports

See also
 Cho Minhaeng
 Mathias Fink

References

External links 
 IBS Center for Molecular Spectroscopy and Dynamics, Korea University
 Super-depth Imaging Lab
 Choi Wonshik - Google Scholar

Optical physicists
Seoul National University alumni
Living people
Academic staff of Korea University
Institute for Basic Science
Year of birth missing (living people)
Fellows of Optica (society)
South Korean physicists
21st-century South Korean scientists
South Korean scientists